John Bryan Wagoner (June 7, 1923 – February 6, 2017) was a Canadian football player who played for the Ottawa Rough Riders and BC Lions. He won the Grey Cup with Ottawa in 1951. He previously attended and played football at North Carolina State University.

References

1923 births
2017 deaths
People from Gibsonville, North Carolina
Ottawa Rough Riders players
Players of American football from North Carolina